Anton Igorevich Zlobin (born 22 February 1993) is a Russian ice hockey forward who is currently an unrestricted free agent. He most recently played for HC Spartak Moscow of the Kontinental Hockey League (KHL).

References

External links

1993 births
Living people
Buran Voronezh players
HC Dynamo Moscow players
Russian ice hockey right wingers
Pittsburgh Penguins draft picks
Shawinigan Cataractes players
HC Spartak Moscow players
Val-d'Or Foreurs players
Wheeling Nailers players
Wilkes-Barre/Scranton Penguins players